"Meco all'altar di Venere" is an aria from the opera Norma by Vincenzo Bellini, sung by the character Pollione in act 1, scene 2.

Libretto 

{| class=wikitable
! Original Italian
! English translation
|-
|Meco all'altar di Venere,
Era Adalgisa in Roma;
Cinta di bende candide,—
Sparsa di fior la chioma.
Udia d'Imene i cantici,
Vedea fumar gl'incensi;
Eran rapiti i sensi—
Di voluttade e amore
|With me in Rome before the shrine
Was Adalgisa bending;
Bound in her locks in hue divine
Rivall'd were lilies blending;
Softly her hand she press'd in mine,
Air breath'd with incense around us.
Sweeter delights await us—
Thy holiest pleasures, love!
|-
|Quando fra noi terribile,
Viene a locarsi un'ombra,
L'ampio mantel Druidico
Come un vapor l'ingombra.
Cade sul l'ara il folgore,
D'un vel si copre il giorno,
Muto si spande intorno—
Un sepolcrale orror.
|When an unearthly, awful shade,
Fashion'd itself from nothing,
Mists, like a Druid mantle laid,
Around it ghastly floated.
Tempest his legion flames arrayed,
Daylight shrank out all sickly,
Hideous, 'mid darkness, thickly
Sepulchred horrors move.
|-
|Più l'adorata vergine
Io non mi trovo accanto,
N'odo da lunge un gemito,
Misto de' figli al pianto,—
Ed una voce orribile,
Echeggia in fondo al tempio:
"Norma così fa scempio
Di amante traditor!"
|Vainly I sought the gentle one
There at the altar kneeling.
Mocking my search, a stifled moan
On o'er the night came stealing;
While in a deep, mysterious tone,
Re-echo'd thro' the temple:
"Norma thus makes example
Of traitors false to love."
|}

References 

Tenor arias
Opera excerpts
1831 compositions
Compositions by Vincenzo Bellini